Janet's Mound, also known as site 22-Ch-520, is an archeological site in the general area of French Camp, Mississippi.  Its specific location is not disclosed, but the site is more significant for its location in an area of the state which has few mounds and where little archeological research of mounds has been conducted.  

It appears to have once been conical in shape but has been damaged by a pothole dug by, presumably, amateurs or professionals seeking artifacts.

As of its listing date, little was known about the site, beyond that it is associated with the Woodland and/or Mississippian cultures.

Its specific location is not public.

References

Mississippian culture
Mounds in Mississippi
Geography of Choctaw County, Mississippi
Archaeological sites on the National Register of Historic Places in Mississippi
National Register of Historic Places in Choctaw County, Mississippi